Greyden Press, LLC is a book printing company headquartered in Dayton, Ohio. The company prints and publishes books and digital products including e-books, DVDs, and CDs, specializing in the scientific, educational, inspirational, and self-publishing markets.

History

Greyden Press, LLC, was formed as a merger of two independent book companies.

In 1967, a company was formed in Dayton, Ohio, that printed multiple listing service (MLS) books for the real estate industry.  After several name changes, this company, now known as Promatch Solutions, LLC, offers HTML5-based real estate software to realtor boards in the United States.  As the real estate industry transitioned from printed books to computers and online listings, Promatch Solutions remained in the MLS business, while it sought new book print markets and developed its technical processes for printing books.

In the early 1990s, the book printing company JK Digital Publishing was founded in Columbus, Ohio, trading as Greyden Press. Greyden Press specialized in digital short-run books—both in hard case and perfect binding —mainly focused on scientific, technical, and educational publishing companies.

In 2009, Promatch Solutions acquired Greyden Press, combining their book production facilities in Dayton, Ohio, under the name Greyden Press, LLC. In 2010, Greyden Press added marketing services to its self-publishing offering. Today, the company specializes in short- to medium-print book runs manufactured on-site. It provides prepress and book production services, content repurposing for digital media such as CDs, DVDs, and Web pages and e-book conversion, plus ISBNs, bar codes, design, composition, file format conversion, author marketing toolkits and fulfillment services.

References

External links 
  

1967 establishments in Ohio
Companies based in Dayton, Ohio
Self-publishing companies
Book publishing companies based in Ohio